Humaira Hasan is a career diplomat from Pakistan.

She is the current ambassador to Spain and Andorra.

Family
Hasan is married with one daughter.

Career

Romania
Between January 2003 and January 2005, she was the ambassador in Romania as well being accredited to Moldova and Bulgaria.

Spain
Since December 2007, she has been Pakistan's ambassador to Spain as well as concurrently being accredited to Andorra.

References

Ambassadors of Pakistan to Spain
Ambassadors of Pakistan to Romania
Ambassadors of Pakistan to Moldova
Ambassadors of Pakistan to Bulgaria
Ambassadors of Pakistan to Andorra
Living people
Pakistani women ambassadors
Year of birth missing (living people)